"Round & Round" is a song by American band Selena Gomez & the Scene. The song was written and produced by Kevin Rudolf, Andrew Bolooki, and Jeff Halavacs, and co-written by Jacob Kasher and Fefe Dobson. It was released on June 22, 2010, as the lead single from the band's second album, A Year Without Rain (2010). "Round & Round" is a dance-driven electro-pop rock song with techno beats. The song received positive reviews, with critics taking note of the song's instant attraction beyond the expected demographic. It peaked at number twenty-four on the Billboard Hot 100, becoming the band's highest-charting single in the United States at the time. It charted moderately in several international markets, including Canada, Germany, and the United Kingdom. Gomez & the Scene performed the song multiple times.

Composition

"Round & Round" is a dance-driven electro-pop rock song with a length of three minutes and five seconds, composed by Kevin Rudolf, Andrew Bolooki, and Jeff Halatrax, Jacob Kasher and Fefe Dobson. The song's disco influence was noted to be new for Gomez's usual "poppy" music. Mikael Wood of Billboard said the song "rides a fist-pumping electro groove". According to Amar Toor of AOL Radio Blog, the song pulls influence from Kylie Minogue circa 2001. The song's lyrics speak of a relationship going around in circles. The song's middle eight is a sing-speak breakdown, in which Gomez raps her lyrics in a Kesha-esque fashion.

Reception

Critical reception
Tim Sendra of Allmusic said that the song was "well sung" and noted it as one of the top tracks on the album. Becky Bain of Idolator said the song had an "infectious tune", and said "might actually be the song to get the non-Disney-centric demographic interested in Selena's tunes." Although commenting that the "glossy electro-pop rock" of the song showed a sophisticated side of Gomez, and the lyrics showed emotional growth, Robert Cospey of Digital Spy said the good work was squandered by the "rusty" chorus. Overall, Copsey complimented Gomez for "avoiding the predictable Hilary/Miley teen-rawk route" and recommended she stay under the Disney umbrella to "perfect her craft further".

Chart performance
Propelled by a debut at number fifteen on the US Hot Digital Songs chart, "Round & Round" debuted at number twenty-four on the Billboard Hot 100, becoming the band's second consecutive top thirty single in the United States. It also appeared on the Billboard charts the Hot Dance Club Play and Pop Songs charts at two and thirty-four. However, it did not match the peaks of its predecessor "Naturally" on those charts, where the latter peaked at one and twelve. The song performed moderately in international markets. It reached fifty-one on the Canadian Hot 100. In the United Kingdom, it reached forty-seven, and was on the chart for three consecutive weeks. "Round & Round" charted in the top sixty in Austria, and Germany, and appeared on the Belgian Flanders tip chart, as well as charting in Slovakia. As of July 2015, "Round & Round" has sold 958,000 copies in the United States.

Music video

The filming of the video was made by Philip Andelman and took place in late May 2010 in Budapest, Hungary during the filming of her film, Monte Carlo. Gomez posted two previews of the song on her Twitter on June 17, 2010, to precede the video's premiere on June 20, 2010, on the Disney Channel and subsequently VEVO. Along with singing on a stage with the Scene, the video features Gomez acting as a secret agent and donning spy apparel, as she plants bugs, takes photos, passes off packages, and other duties. She is then caught by other spys and is chased throughout the city, with another secret agent she works with covers her back as she runs away. It ends with Gomez blowing out the match she previously struck. Nadine Cheung of AOL JSYK said, "We love the storyline for the video and how it's mixed in with performance shots of Selena and her band the Scene. Of course, the 17-year-old star is decked out in amazing outfits, no matter if she's rocking out on stage or being followed by cloaked agents."

Live performances and promotion
The song was performed by the band on America's Got Talent on July 14, 2010. It was also performed on Good Morning America on September 23, 2010, along with "A Year Without Rain". While promoting in the United Kingdom, Gomez appeared on Daybreak on September 27, 2010, and on Blue Peter on the following day, September 28, 2010. Gomez performed the song on MTV's The Seven on October 1, 2010.

Track listing

US digital download
"Round & Round" – 3:05

Round & Round (Dave Audé Remix) – Single
"Round & Round" (Dave Audé Remix) – 3:32

Australian / UK Remixes EP
"Round & Round" (Wideboys Club Mix) – 5:56
"Round & Round" (Fascination Club Mix) – 6:11
"Round & Round" (7th Heaven Club Mix) – 6:08
"Round & Round" (Dave Audé Club Remix) – 6:23

Australian digital single
 "Round & Round" – 3:05
"Naturally" (Ralphi Rosario Remix) – 3:39

UK single
"Round & Round" – 3:05
"Naturally" (Ralphi Rosario Remix) – 3:39

Credits and personnel
Credits and personnel adapted from A Year Without Rain album liner notes.

 Selena Gomez – lead vocals
 Kevin Rudolf – songwriting, production
 Andrew Bolooki – songwriting, production
 Jeff Halatrax – songwriting, production
 Fefe Dobson – songwriting
 Jacob Kasher – songwriting

 Jon Lind – vocal production
 Brian Reeves – vocal production
 Serban Ghenea – mastering
 Robert Vosgien – mastering
 John Hanes – mix engineering
 Tim Roberts – mix engineering assistance

Charts

Certifications

Radio and release history

References

External links
 

2010 singles
Techno songs
Selena Gomez & the Scene songs
Songs written by Fefe Dobson
Hollywood Records singles
Songs written by Jacob Kasher
Songs written by Kevin Rudolf
Music videos directed by Philip Andelman
2010 songs